"Tug of War" is the title track from Paul McCartney’s 1982 album Tug of War.

Reception
Rolling Stone described the song as McCartney's equivalent to John Lennon's "Imagine". The song has a clear division between the verses featuring sad lyrics about the struggle to survive, the necessity of conflict (pushing and pulling) and the hopeful refrain, in which McCartney looks for a future where these struggles are no longer necessary. The lyrics have been interpreted as a description of his complex relationship with Lennon, who was killed two years prior.

Cash Box said that the song is "an intriguing mix of the acoustic and the symphonic," saying that "guitar blends with strings while Paul sings of the constant push and pull in our present lives and a more optimistic 'time to come' when 'we will be dancing to the beat played on a different drum.'"  Billboard called it a "wistful slice of pop philosophy given depth by George Martin's orchestration and the vocalist's graceful transition from stately verses to urgent bridge."

The single reached number 11 in Poland, number 53 in the UK and number 53 in the US. It also reached number 31 on the Billboard Adult Contemporary chart.

The album version starts with the sounds of people grunting as part of a real tug of war—a popular sporting event since ancient times, before Paul goes into the song. These sounds were recorded during the National Indoors Tug of War Championship in Huddersfield, by Eddie Klein on December 7 1980, one day before his bandmate John Lennon was shot and killed. At the end of the song, it fades into "Take It Away". The single version omits these factors.

Music video
The music video for "Tug of War" was directed by Maurice Phillips.

Personnel
Paul McCartney – lead and backing vocals, acoustic guitar, electric guitar, bass, synthesizer, drums
Linda McCartney – backing vocals
Eric Stewart – electric guitar, backing vocals
Denny Laine – electric guitar
Campbell Maloney – military snares
Kenneth Sillito – orchestral arrangement

Track listing
7" single
 "Tug of War"
 "Get It" (with Carl Perkins)

References

1982 singles
Paul McCartney songs
Songs written by Paul McCartney
Parlophone singles
Song recordings produced by George Martin
Music published by MPL Music Publishing
1981 songs
Symphonic rock songs